The Motorola v950 "Renegade" is a clamshell style mobile phone, using CDMA technology. It is MIL-STD-810 certified. The base phone model is a Motorola RAZR.

The Motorola Renegade was released exclusively for Sprint, but unregistered phones can be registered to other CDMA networks.

Renegade v950